Friendly Fire is an American television movie first broadcast on the ABC network on April 22, 1979. Watched that night by an estimated 64 million people, Friendly Fire went on to win four Emmy awards, including Outstanding Drama Special. The film was directed by David Greene.

The movie tells the real-life story of Peg Mullen (played by Carol Burnett), a woman from rural Iowa who with her husband works against government obstacles to uncover the actual details and facts about the death of their son Michael, an Army infantry soldier killed by "friendly fire" in February 1970 during the Vietnam War.
Her husband Gene, a World War II veteran, is played by Ned Beatty.

Sergeant Mullen was drafted in September 1968 after he graduated from college and sent to South Vietnam (Republic of Vietnam) assigned to the 198th Infantry Brigade, 23rd Infantry Division (Americal Division) in September 1969. He was listed as a non-battle casualty after being accidentally killed with another soldier from an exploding Army artillery shell burst fragment, while Mullen and most of his platoon were asleep at night on their hilltop position; the government did not report publicly the number of non-battle deaths or their names on its weekly casualty lists during the war.

Friendly Fire is adapted by Fay Kanin from C. D. B. Bryan's 1976 book of the same name. The book was adapted from a series of New Yorker magazine articles Bryan had written about the Mullens and their ordeal.

Cast
 Carol Burnett as Peg Mullen
 Ned Beatty as Gene Mullen
 Sam Waterston as C. D. B. Bryan
 Dennis Erdman as Michael E. Mullen
 Timothy Hutton as John Mullen
 Fanny Spiess as Mary Mullen
 Sherry Hursey as Patricia Mullen
 Michael Flanagan as Father Shimon
 Hilly Hicks as Willis Huddleston
 William Jordan  as Col. Byron Schindler
 Vernon Weddle as Col. Georgi
 Jack Rader as Sgt. Fitzgerald
 Robert Wahler as Alan Hulting
 David Keith as Leroy Hamilton

See also
 6th Infantry Regiment (United States)
 Vietnam War casualties

References

External links

New York Times overview of Friendly Fire

1979 television films
1979 films
ABC network original films
American television films
Vietnam War films
Films scored by Leonard Rosenman
Films directed by David Greene
Films set in the 1970s
Films set in Iowa
Peabody Award-winning broadcasts